Golden Acres is a census-designated place (CDP) in Cibola County, New Mexico, United States. It was first listed as a CDP prior to the 2020 census.

The CDP is in northern Cibola County, northwest of Milan. It is bordered to the east by the Milan town limits and to the west by Interstate 40. New Mexico State Road 122, following the historic route of U.S. Route 66, runs through the eastern side of the community, through the site of the former community of Toltec.

Demographics

References 

Census-designated places in Cibola County, New Mexico
Census-designated places in New Mexico